Dalalíf (English: Pastoral Life) is an Icelandic comedy film released in 1984, directed by Þráinn Bertelsson and stars Eggert Þorleifsson and Karl Ágúst Úlfsson. It is the second film in the Líf trilogy and a sequel to Nýtt líf.

Synopsis
Con artists Þór and Danni present themselves as experts on agriculture and hoax an unfortunate farmer into trusting them with his animals while going abroad. Obviously, he shouldn't have. When they have managed to get the "hold" of things they get the brilliant idea to have an agricultural seminar for city people on the farm.

Cast
Karl Ágúst Úlfsson as Daníel 'Danni' Ólafsson
Eggert Þorleifsson as Þór Magnússon
Hrafnhildur Valbjörnsdottir as Katrín
Sigurður Sigurjónsson as JP
Marentza Poulsen as Marit

References

External links
Dalalíf on kvikmyndir.is
Dalalíf on Kvikmyndavefurinn
 

1984 films
1980s Icelandic-language films
Films directed by Þráinn Bertelsson
Icelandic comedy films
1984 comedy films